Lety may refer to places in the Czech Republic:

Lety (Písek District), a municipality and village in the South Bohemian Region
Lety concentration camp, located in the municipality during World War II
Lety (Prague-West District), a municipality and village in the Central Bohemian Region